Steve Wheatcroft (born February 21, 1978) is an American professional golfer.

Wheatcroft was born in Indiana, Pennsylvania, grew up in Washington, Pennsylvania, and attended Indiana University earning a degree in Sports Marketing and Management. He turned professional in 2001 and has played in several tours over the years. His first victory came at the Pennsylvania Open Championship in 2003. He is currently a member of the PGA Tour.

In his 2006 Nationwide Tour debut season, Wheatcroft recorded only one top-10 and missed the cut 12 times. Despite his difficulties, he would perform well at the PGA Tour Q-School. He finished 7th to earn his card for 2007. He would make only 10 cuts out of 25 attempts and post one top 25. Consequently, he lost his card. He returned to the Nationwide Tour in 2008 and had disappointing results until the summer of 2009.

Wheatcroft made some changes to his game. As a result, he recorded six top-10s and two top-25s before the end of the season. He launched up the money list to 20th and earned his card for the 2010 PGA Tour.

Wheatcroft would play well at the Puerto Rico Open, finishing tied for 3rd, three strokes behind fellow Nationwide Tour graduate, Derek Lamely. He also qualified for the 2010 U.S. Open after winning a 4-way playoff at the Rockville, Maryland sectional qualifier. He led briefly midway through the second round.  He returned to the Nationwide Tour for the 2011 season after finishing 166th on the PGA Tour's money list.

At the 2011 Melwood Prince George's County Open, Wheatcroft won by a record-breaking 12 strokes. At the 72nd hole, he made an eagle putt to finish at 255 (-29); shattering the previous 72-hole scoring record by three strokes. He also set the record for largest 54-hole lead by eight strokes.

Wheatcroft's strong play would continue through the 2011 season, with three more top-10s and four top-25s. After finishing tied for 8th at the season-ending Nationwide Tour Championship, he ended the year at 20th on the money list. Wheatcroft returned to the PGA Tour once again for 2012.

Wheatcroft played on the Web.com Tour in 2013 and 2014. In 2014, he finished 19th in the regular season rankings to earn another return to the PGA Tour.

Professional wins (3)

Web.com Tour wins (2)

Web.com Tour playoff record (1–0)

Other wins (1)
2003 Pennsylvania Open Championship

Results in major championships

"T" = Tied
Note: Wheatcroft only played in the U.S. Open.

See also
2006 PGA Tour Qualifying School graduates
2009 Nationwide Tour graduates
2011 Nationwide Tour graduates
2014 Web.com Tour Finals graduates
2017 Web.com Tour Finals graduates

References

External links

American male golfers
Indiana Hoosiers men's golfers
PGA Tour golfers
Korn Ferry Tour graduates
Golfers from Pennsylvania
Indiana University alumni
People from Indiana, Pennsylvania
Golfers from Jacksonville, Florida
1978 births
Living people